Sand Lakes Provincial Park is a provincial park in the Canadian province of Manitoba, designated by the Government of Manitoba in 1995.

See also
List of protected areas of Manitoba
Seal River (Manitoba)
Caspian tern

References

External links
Find Your Favorite Park: Sand Lakes Provincial Park

Provincial parks of Manitoba
Protected areas of Manitoba